Jack Hingert (born 26 September 1990) is an English-Australian-Sri Lankan football (soccer) player who plays as a defender for A-League club Brisbane Roar. 

In 2016, Hingert became an ambassador for the RSPCA Queensland a fitting role for the footballer who has been fostering dogs from the RSPCA for the past four years. Hingert has now fostered more than 14 dogs.

Early life 
Hingert was born in London, England and attended Smitham Primary School and Woodcote High School in Coulsdon, London. He moved to Australia as a teenager, settling in Melbourne, Victoria and attended Wesley College in Glen Waverley and Lyndale secondary college in Dandenong, Melbourne.

Club career 
Hingert's football career began during his time living in England from the age of 14. He spent four years strengthening his skills at the Crystal Palace youth academy before his first stint with Peterborough United in 2008/09.

Hingert moved to Australia with his family at the age of 14 and spent his youth career in Melbourne. In 2009, Hingert played for the Dandenong Thunder in the Victorian Premier League.

In 2009, Hingert moved to Queensland to play in the A-League for the North Queensland Fury making 11 appearances with the team before unfortunate circumstances saw the Club close down in 2011.

In 2011, Hingert moved back to Melbourne to play for the Dandenong Thunder in the Victorian Premier League during the A-League off-season.

In July 2011, Hingert signed a two-year contract with Brisbane Roar. Hingert has played for the Brisbane Roar for the past seven years and established himself as an integral part of the team and Brisbane Roar community. Over the past seven years, Hingert has made over 150 appearances, including winning 2x A-League Championships with the team in the 2011/2012 and 2013/2014 seasons.

Hingert scored his maiden A-League goal in the 2014/15 Round 25 clash against Adelaide United, ordaining the goal with a Karate Kid celebration.

In April 2018, Hingert re-signed with the Brisbane Roar on a two-year contract.

Hingert has become a valued footballer in the Brisbane Roar community and fan favourite. In 2018, Hingert appeared in an individual segment with the Brisbane Roar called 'JackTV' which saw him interview new players for the upcoming 2018/2019 season. Additionally, in 2018 Hingert was featured in a Fox Sports campaign and new players kit campaign for the Brisbane Roar with his international teammate, Eric Bautheac.

Honours 
Brisbane Roar
 A-League Championship: 2011–12
 A-League Championship: 2013–14

References 

1990 births
English footballers
Australian soccer players
Association football fullbacks
Sutton United F.C. players
Crystal Palace F.C. players
Knox City FC players
Peterborough United F.C. players
Dandenong Thunder SC players
Northern Fury FC players
Brisbane Roar FC players
A-League Men players
English emigrants to Australia
Living people
People educated at Woodcote High School
Footballers from Greater London
Soccer players from Melbourne
Sportsmen from Victoria (Australia)
People educated at Wesley College (Victoria)